Robin Gray (born 21 December 1963 in Glasgow, Scotland) is a Scottish and Irish curler.

Teams

Men's

Mixed

References

External links

1963 births
Living people
Curlers from Glasgow
Irish male curlers
Scottish male curlers